Valea Poienii River may refer to:
 Valea Poienii, a tributary of the Valea Cheii in Brașov County, Romania
 Poieni, a tributary of the Cheia in Alba County, Romania
 Valea Poienii, a tributary of the Râul Târgului in Argeș County, Romania
 Valea Poienii, a tributary of the Vărbilău in Prahova County, Romania